Lyndon Township may refer to the following places in the United States:

 Lyndon Township, Whiteside County, Illinois
 Lyndon Township, Michigan

Township name disambiguation pages